Yes Yes Yes  (foaled 26 September 2016) is a retired Australian thoroughbred racehorse. He won The Everest, and over seven million dollars.

Background
Yes Yes Yes was purchased by Darren Weir Racing/John Foote Bloodstock for $200,000 at the Magic Millions yearling sale.

Racing career
Yes Yes Yes made his debut at Moonee Valley on 1 December 2018, where he "ran on well" for a second. A fortnight later, he won his first race. After settling near the rear of the field, he "came through powerfully between horses inside the final 200m". Trainer Weir was then considering entering the Magic Millions Classic, saying, "He's got the right attitude and he's got the ability. It's a good prize money race so if he's holding together it would certainly be something to think about." He was then spelled instead.

In February 2019, trainer Darren Weir was banned for four years for the use of taser-like devices on his horses to improve performance. Yes Yes Yes was transferred to trainer Chris Waller. After a trial in February 2019, Yes Yes Yes resumed in the Group 2 Todman Stakes in March. Running last at the final bend, he won the race by half a length. Waller said, ""It's good to be able to take over a horse like this with prize money in the bank for the Slipper. Was good for my team to get familiar with the horse. We've had him for a number of weeks now, we picked out this race and full credit to the team where he has come from, they'd done a good job educating him well." As expected, Yes Yes Yes went on to the Golden Slipper, finishing seventh on a heavy track.

After a long spell, Yes Yes Yes had two trials in August. In September he raced in the Group 2 The Run to the Rose and the Group 1 Golden Rose, finishing second behind Bivouac in each.

In 2019, Yes Yes Yes was successful in The Everest at Randwick Racecourse.  Trained by Chris Waller and ridden by Glen Boss, the colt won by half a length at odds of 8/1.

Stud career
Yes Yes Yes was retired to stud duties at Coolmore Stud in February 2020 after sustaining a tendon injury.
His initial service fee was listed as A$38,500.

Pedigree

References 
 

2016 racehorse births
Racehorses trained in Australia
Racehorses bred in Australia
Thoroughbred family 22-d